The 2002 German Figure Skating Championships took place on December 6–9, 2001 in Berlin. Skaters competed in the disciplines of men's singles, ladies' singles, pair skating, ice dancing, and synchronized skating.

Results

Men

Ladies

Pairs

Ice dancing

Synchronized

External links
 2002 German Figure Skating Championships results

German Figure Skating Championships, 2002
German Figure Skating Championships